Palaquium decurrens is a tree in the family Sapotaceae. The specific epithet decurrens means "running down", referring to the leaf base.

Description
The bark is dark brown. Inflorescences bear up to eight flowers.

Distribution and habitat
Palaquium decurrens is endemic to Borneo. Its habitat is lowland mixed dipterocarp forests.

References

decurrens
Endemic flora of Borneo
Plants described in 1925